Tell No One is a 2006 French thriller film.

Tell No One may also refer to:
Tell No One (2012 film), 2012 Italian comedy film
Tell No One (2019 film), 2019 Polish documentary film
Tell No One (novel), 2001 American thriller novel